Consolidated Contractors Company (CCC) is the largest construction company in the Middle East and ranks among the top 25 international contractors with a revenue of US$5.3 billion in 2013 and 7.4 billion by 2017. CCC has offices and projects in over 40 countries, and a workforce of 120,000 employees (2019). In April 2019, CCC was engaged in 40 ongoing projects globally. The majority of its sales (some 80%) are in the Middle East.

Founded in 1952, this privately held company "offers commercial project management, engineering, procurement, and construction services", according to Bloomberg. The company's own publications discuss "construction, engineering, procurement, development and investment activities internationally"
in areas from the Middle East to Africa, Australia and Papua New Guinea.

History
In the summer of 1941, after having graduated from American University in Beirut, Hasib Sabbagh, one of the founders of CCC, returned to Palestine to find a job. After a number of disappointing job offers, he decided to start his own business and went to Beirut in spring 1948, where a number of his brothers and sisters had already sought refuge due to the Arab- Israeli war. Hasib set up his own company with his brother-in-law Said Khoury and some other businessmen from Syria and Lebanon, and called it Consolidated Contractors Company.

The company's first headquarters was in Homs, Syria, but later moved to Beirut, where Hasib Sabbagh, Said Khoury, and Kamel Abedelrahman, the founders, became the sole owners of CCC to create and Arab construction company. In 1950, CCC won a large contract to build pipelines from Kirkuk in Iraq, to Banyas in Syria, and Tripoli in Lebanon. In 1952, CCC was able to obtain another major contract for a Bechtel-Wimpey joint venture, this time in Aden, to build a major refinery and a camp for workers. A year later, CCC won projects in the United Arab Emirates, Bahrain, and Qatar. In 1973, CCC set up the National Petroleum Construction Company in Abu Dhabi to provide offshore services to the oil and gas industries in all the countries of the Persian Gulf. Today NPCC has an annual revenue of over US$800 million	

In 1975, when the civil war broke out in Lebanon, CCC moved its headquarters first to London and then to Athens in 1976. In the same year, Abd al-Rahman decided to sell his shares in CCC to Sabbagh and Khoury. In the 1980s, CCC was restructured and the CCC owners aimed at expanding the company's operations into Europe, the United States, and Asia. CCC bought Underwater Engineering, a British firm that worked on underwater oil projects, and ACWa, an environmental company. CCC also bought SICON, an Italian mechanical engineering company specializing in petroleum-related projects. They then acquired the Morganti Group, a construction firm in the United States.	

To diversify its projects, CCC started a partnership with Canadian OXY, and won a bid to explore for oil in Masila, South Yemen. Fortunately, oil was found in large quantities. Oil exports from Masila peaked at 170,000 barrels per day.	

The Iraqi invasion of Kuwait in August 1990 dealt a heavy blow to CCC's operations in the Persian Gulf region. The company had to move all of its employees out of Kuwait and close down its business operations there. However, by the mid-1990s, CCC emerged again as a thriving company after having navigated successfully the economic and political downturns of the early 1990s growing into the versatile and diversified large international construction company it is today.

In 2019, CCC specializes inHeavy Civil Construction, Buildings and Civil Engineering Works, Mechanical Engineering Works, Heavy and Light Industrial Plants, Marine Works, Offshore Installations, Highways, roads and airports, and Pipelines for water, gas, oil and slurry.

Notable projects

CCC has a portfolio that includes oil and gas plants, refineries and petrochemical facilities, pipelines, power and desalination plants, light industries, water and sewage treatment plants, airports and seaports, heavy civil works, dams, reservoirs and distribution systems, road networks and skyscrapers.

CCC is constructing the Riyadh metro
CCC constructed the Azerbaijani section of The Baku–Tbilisi–Ceyhan pipeline. It connects Baku, the capital of Azerbaijan and Ceyhan, a port on the south-eastern Mediterranean coast of Turkey, via Tbilisi, the capital of Georgia. It is the second-longest oil pipeline in the former Soviet Union, after the Druzhba pipeline. CCC's scope included engineering, procurement, installation, construction and commissioning of 886 km crude oil and gas pipeline.

CCC built the $1-billion Presidential Palace in Abu Dhabi. The palace houses the offices of the president, the Crown Prince, and ministers. It is set on a 1,500,000 sq m including the palace, which will be 160,000 sq m. The ancillary buildings, over a site of 23,000 sqm, includes a public majlis, a mosque, staff and military accommodations, a services compound, and various gatehouses and watchtowers. The project also includes 2000m of six-metre seawall and 4 million cubic metres of dredging.

CCC is now constructing in a joint venture the Riyadh metro

A joint venture between CCC and Saipem constructed the main works at the Karachaganak field in western Kazakhstan. The projects' s value was about 1.1 billion dollars. The contract covered civil works, infrastructures and mechanical works related to a production unit and gas reinjection facilities, a gas process plant and a 635 km x 24" pipeline with a pumping station and terminal.

In Abu Dhabi, CCC contributed to the construction of the Offshore Associated Gas Project, and Habshan Facilities, and the largest ethylene cracker in the world. The ongoing projects are The Landmark (Abu Dhabi), once completed in 2011, the development will be the second highest tower in Abu Dhabi (324 m); Khalifa Port Shah Sulfur Station & Pipelines;

Elsewhere in the Persian Gulf, CCC has been working on a number of major projects in Qatar, including:
Khursaniyah Producing Facilities & Gas Plants in Saudi Arabia’s Eastern Province. The Khalifa Sports Hall, Doha, Qatar. This new sports hall is the world’s largest air-conditioned indoor facility of its kind.

CCC also built the Nile Corniche Project in Cairo: One of the largest construction projects in Egypt and the Ritz Carlton hotel in Doha.

The Bethlehem Convention Palace is a joint investment of CCC and the Palestine Investment Fund. The site includes the three historic Solomon's Pools, 
Murad Castle (or Burâk Castle) housing the Castle Museum, an amphitheater that can host nearly 1,500 people, the Handicraft Center traditional bazaar and a natural heritage forest. The General Manager of the site is George N Bassous, who is also a Board Vice President at CCC. the Handicraft Center traditional bazaar and a natural heritage forest.

Major projects

CCC has completed the construction of the largest gas to liquids (GTL) project in the World. The Qatargas 3 & 4 LNG Plant, Trains 6 & 7 in Qatar; the largest LNG Trains in the world at 7.82 MTPA. With these two trains completed, CCC can proudly announce that it is the most experienced worldwide liquified natural gas (LNG) construction contractor, having achieved the completion of 17 LNG Trains with a total capacity of 82 MTPA, equivalent to 30% of all LNG facilities in the world.

The Dubai Mall which was constructed by CCC is the largest shopping center in the world. The project comprised a 515,000 m² mall area, which is about the size of 50 soccer fields, a 550,000 m² car parking area, and a district cooling plant building of 42,000 refrigeration tons. The Mall features 1,200 stores and also boasts  The Dubai Aquarium and Underwater Zoo, the Olympic-sized Dubai Ice Rink, children’s "edutainment" concept Kidzania and a massive indoor cinema complex. The Aquarium includes a 270 degree walk through tunnel and the world's largest viewing window. The Dubai Aquarium and Discovery Center clinched the Guinness World Record for the World's Largest Acrylic Panel, measuring 32.88 meters wide × 8.3 m high x 750 mm thick, and weighing 245,614 kg.

Princess Nora bint Abdul Rahman University (site works infrastructure & utility plant) is one of the ten largest universities in the world and is the largest women-only university in the world. It is the first green campus in Saudi Arabia. The 8,000,000 sq m comprises academic buildings, administration buildings, a hospital, research centers, staff and student housing, schools, sports facilities, plant and utility buildings and a 5 km long utility tunnel. The university can accommodate up to 40,000 students and 4,000 employees.

In an April 2019 report, CCC listed these as its landmark construction projects: "the Dubai Mall, the Abu Dhabi International Airport – Midfield Terminal Building, Riyadh Metro Project, 30% of all LNG facilities in the world, residential towers, hotels, power stations, water and sewage treatment plants and networks, roads and bridges, industrial and process plants and pipelines around the world".

Airport projects

The Midfield Terminal of the Abu Dhabi International Airport, a US$3.2 billion project, was awarded to the joint venture of CCC, TAV and Arabtec. The 700,000 m2 Midfield Terminal building is one of the largest airport projects ever conceived and will more than double passenger capacity at Abu Dhabi International Airport to 47 million people, in line with passenger projections up until at least 2030.

The Muscat International Airport expansion is a multi-million US dollar project (2009–2014) that will increase the airport's capacity by 12 million passengers per year. The joint venture between CCC and Turkey's TAV was awarded the US$1.3 billion contract to carry out all the civil works. This includes construction of a new airfield (northern runway and all associate taxiways); refurbishment of the existing airfield; all utility works, construction of utility buildings and substations; airside and landside road system including bridges and interchanges; drainage works; and soft and hard landscaping. CCC also constructed the six-lane flyover bridge linking the New Muscat Airport to 18 November Street.

CCC was heavily involved in the construction of the new the Hamad International Airport in Qatar. Across several packages, CCC's scope entailed the air traffic control tower and its support facilities, midfield area access system, midfield telecommunication building, fire stations, administrative building blocks, the medical center and employee village, the general aviation hangar and the solid waste handling facility.

A joint venture between Vinci SA, CCC, TAV & Odebrecht was awarded in 2007 the construction of the US$2 billion new Tripoli International Airport Terminal buildings in Libya. The two terminals will have a total built area of 325,000 sq m and will accommodate up to 20 million passengers annually. The construction was not hold due to the political instabilities in the region but has now resumed. CCC is also building the US$500 billion new passenger terminal at the Sabha Airport in Southern Libya.

A joint venture between Hochtief and CCC built the US$490 million Rafic Hariri International Airport In Beirut, Lebanon between 1994 and 2000.

The Komo Airport and Infrastructure in Papua New Guinea was construction by the McConnell and CCC joint venture. Located 1,600 meters above sea level, the runway is 3.2 kilometres long and 45 metres wide. The airfield is designed to specifically accommodate the Antonov An-124 Ruslan planes. These massive Ukrainian cargo aircraft will bring in large pieces of equipment for the construction of the PNG LNG project's Hides gas field conditioning plant, which is located 10 km away to the northeast of Komo Airfield. The airfield will also be used as a base to fly in workers on Bombardier Dash 8 aircraft to assist future upstream efforts in the wider region.

References

External links
 
 The Top 225 International Contractors-2011

Construction and civil engineering companies of Greece
Construction and civil engineering companies of Lebanon
1948 establishments in Lebanon
Construction and civil engineering companies established in 1948